Monrupino is a comune (municipality) in the Province of Trieste in the Italian region Friuli-Venezia Giulia, located about  north of Trieste, on the border with Slovenia. According to the 1971 census, 77.3% of the population are Slovenes.

The municipality of Monrupino contains the frazioni (subdivisions, mainly villages and hamlets) Fernetti, Zolla, Rupingrande.

Border crossings into Slovenia are located at Monrupino (called Repentabor on the Slovenian side) and Fernetti (Fernetiči).

Monrupino borders the following municipalities: Trieste, Sgonico, Sežana (Slovenia).

Demographic evolution

Politics
Traditionally, Monrupino has been a left-leaning municipality. In the 1950s and 1960s, it was part of the so-called "red belt" around Trieste: that is, of those municipalities around the city dominated by the Communist Party. In June 1949, in the first municipal elections in the Free Territory of Trieste, the Communist-led Slavic-Italian Anti-Fascist Union won 97% of the votes. The election result was heralded by the Soviet press as a victory for the Communist Party.

Since the 1970s, the centrist party of the Slovene minority in Italy, the Slovene Union, started gaining support. In the last few decades, the Slovene Union and the Italian leftist party (the Democratic Party, before the Democrats of the Left and before them the Communist Party) alternate in power. Currently, the municipality is led by a mayor of the Slovene Union, which is also the largest party in the Municipal Council (with around 45% of votes).

References

See also
Karst Plateau
Gorizia and Gradisca
Julian March
Slovene Lands

Cities and towns in Friuli-Venezia Giulia
Italy–Slovenia border crossings